Randall K. Wolf, MD, FACS, FACC (born 5 February 1953) is a cardiothoracic surgeon, inventor, former radio personality, and magician.  He is the creator of the Wolf Mini Maze, a procedure used to correct atrial fibrillation (AF). Wolf previously hosted a weekly radio show, "Take Charge of Your Health" on WKRC (AM) in Cincinnati, Ohio from 2011-2014.

Medical career
Wolf serves on the Global Medical Advisory Board of StopAfib.org, a patient-to-patient resource to control atrial fibrillation. Currently, Wolf is a member of the DeBakey Heart and Vascular Center, Houston Methodist Hospital, Texas Medical Center.  He is the arrhythmia specialist in the DeBakey group.  He will be serving as faculty member for the 10th Annual Re-Evolution Summit for Minimally Invasive Cardiac Surgery hosted by the Debakey Institute for Cardiovascular Education and Training on April 4–5, 2019.  Wolf served as Lt. Col. Chuck Miller's cardiac surgeon, as noted in Col. Miller's most recent book Soaring With Destiny.

In 2015, Wolf relocated the Atrial Fibrillation Center to Houston, Texas where he was featured on Fox 26 News.  He served as visiting professor to the University of Texas from 2015-2018.

In 2012, Wolf inaugurated the Atrial Fibrillation Center at The Indiana Heart Hospital in Indianapolis, Indiana where he served as Co-director of the Atrial Fibrillation Center until 2014.

Wolf returned to the University of Cincinnati as professor of surgery and biomedical engineering from 2003-2007. While at UC, Dr. Wolf served as the 2006 President of the International Society of Minimially Invasive Cardiothoracic Surgery (ISMICS) and the 2007 President of the 21st Century Cardiothoracic Surgery Society (21CCSS).

He also has served as director of the minimally invasive surgery project   at Ohio State University from 1998-2003.  Dr. Wolf helped pioneer the coronary bypass procedure using the da Vinci Surgical System while at Ohio State.

Wolf was featured on the PBS show Scientific American Frontiers hosted by Alan Alda on the show's January 23, 2001 episode "Affairs of the Heart."

Radio
Wolf hosted a weekly radio show, "Take Charge of Your Health," on WKRC (AM) based out of Cincinnati from 2011-2014.  The show aired from 6 to 7 PM EST Sunday nights.

The show discussed important health topics with in-studio physician specialists from around the world.

Magic
Dr. Wolf is professional magician and magician member of the Academy of Magical Arts.  He continues to perform for events in the United States and points beyond.

Print and Press
Wolf has published over 100 peer reviewed articles, book chapters and invited commentaries in medical journals. See publication list.

Honors and awards

Patents

References

Living people
American cardiac surgeons
1953 births